B'nai Israel Synagogue and Montefiore Cemetery in Grand Forks, North Dakota consists of historic B'nai Israel Synagogue built in 1937 at 601 Cottonwood Street and its related historic Montefiore Cemetery at 1450 North Columbia Road which dates from 1888. B'Nai Israel (Hebrew for "Sons/Children of Israel") Synagogue was designed by noted Grand Forks architect Joseph Bell DeRemer in the Art Deco style of architecture and built by local builders Skarsbro and Thorwaldson at a cost of $14,000. It replaced the earlier wooden Congregation of the Children of Israel synagogue built in 1891 at 2nd Avenue, South & 7th Street. Montefiore Cemetery in Grand Forks is one of many institutions named for Sir Moses Montefiore. On October 13, 2011, B'nai Israel Synagogue and Montefiore Cemetery was added to the National Register of Historic Places

The congregation was first chartered on August 26, 1891. It was founded by Eastern European Jews, including Jews fleeing pogroms in Russia and Lithuanian Jews. In the early 1990s, B'nai Israel joined the Union of American Hebrew Congregations (now the Union for Reform Judaism).

References

External links
 B'nai Israel Synagogue website
 Montefiore Cemetery at Find A Grave
 Teri Finneman, North Dakota Sites Recommended for NRHP
 Kimberly K. Porter, Ph.D, Taking the University to the People: Experiential Education via Oral History, recounts an oral history project involving Jewish life in Grand Forks
 Museum of Family History, excerpt from Jewish Life in a Small North Dakota Town, circa 1940s, by Gladys Smith of Grand Forks

Synagogues in North Dakota
Jewish cemeteries in North Dakota
Cemeteries on the National Register of Historic Places in North Dakota
National Register of Historic Places in Grand Forks, North Dakota
Properties of religious function on the National Register of Historic Places in North Dakota
Synagogues on the National Register of Historic Places
Lithuanian-Jewish culture in the United States
Russian-American culture in North Dakota
Russian-Jewish culture in the United States
Ukrainian-Jewish culture in the United States
Synagogues completed in 1937
1937 establishments in North Dakota
Joseph Bell DeRemer buildings
Art Deco architecture in North Dakota
Art Deco synagogues